Parque Mayer is a 2018 Portuguese comedy drama film directed by António-Pedro Vasconcelos. The film stars Francisco Froes and Daniela Melchior in the main lead roles. The film was released on 6 December 2018.

Cast 

 Francisco Froes as Mário Pintor
 Daniela Melchior as Deolinda
 Diogo Morgado as Eduardo Gonzaga
 Miguel Guilherme as José
 Alexandra Lencastre as Madame Calado
 Carla Maciel as Maria Gusmão
 Sérgio Praia as Augusto

References

External links 
 

2018 comedy-drama films
2018 films
2010s Portuguese-language films
Portuguese comedy-drama films
Sophia Award winners